Nedmaneh (also romanized as Nadmanah) is Najwa Karam's eleventh studio album and one of her best-selling recordings. It shipped an estimated 4 million units worldwide.

Track listing
1. Yal Haneet (You just fell in love with me)
2. Nedmaneh (Regret)
3. 'Aaskah (Falling in love)
4. Ana Meen (Who am I?)
5. El Jar Abel El Dar (People rather than places)
6. Roba'i Wa Khomasi (Confused)
7. Mkassar 'Asa (Scapegoat)
8. 'Aaskah (Instrumental)

2001 albums
Najwa Karam albums
Rotana Records albums